The  is an international martial arts organization  based in Japan and headed by Masaaki Hatsumi. The combat system taught by this organization comprises nine separate ryūha, or schools, which are collectively referred to as Bujinkan Budō Taijutsu. The Bujinkan is most commonly associated with ninjutsu. However, Masaaki Hatsumi uses the term Budo (meaning martial way) as he says the ryūha are descended from historical samurai schools that teach samurai martial tactics and ninjutsu schools that teach ninja tactics.

Training
The Bujinkan organization incorporates the teachings of the martial arts lineages (ryūha) that Masaaki Hatsumi learned  from Takamatsu Toshitsugu under the banner of Bujinkan Budo Taijutsu. 
These are:

Togakure-ryū Ninpō Taijutsu (戸隠流忍法体術)
Gyokushin-ryū Ryū Ninpō (玉心流忍法)
Kumogakure Ryū Ninpō (雲隠流忍法)
Koto Ryū Koppō jutsu (虎倒流骨法術)
Gyokko-ryū Kosshi jutsu (玉虎流骨指術)
Kuki Shinden Happō Bikenjutsu (九鬼神伝流八法秘剣術)
Shinden Fudo Ryū Dakentai jutsu (神伝不動流打拳体術)
Takagi Yoshin Ryū Jūtai jutsu (高木揚心流柔体術)
Gikan Ryū Koppō jutsu (義鑑流骨法術)

At around the time of Hatsumi's 88th birthday (Beiju: :ja:米寿) on 2 December 2019, he announced  his successors for most of the above schools:

Togakure-ryū: Tsutsui Takumi
Gyokushin-ryū: Kan Jun'ichi
Kumogakure-ryū: Furuta Kōji
Kotō-ryū: Noguchi Yukio
Gyokko-ryū: Ishizuka Tetsuji
Kukishin-ryū: Iwata Yoshio
Shinden Fudō-ryū: Nagato Toshirō
Takagi Yōshin-ryū: Sakasai Norio
Gikan-ryū: Sakasai Norio

Bujinkan Budō Taijutsu training does not include participation in competitions or contests,  as the school's training aims to develop the ability to protect oneself and others using techniques that focus on disabling an attacker (and/or removing their desire/ability to continue) as quickly and efficiently as possible.

This training is conducted in a manner in which there are predefined "attackers" (tori) and "receivers" (uke) similar to drills in judo (gokyo) or traditional Japanese martial arts. However, the Bujinkan differs from many traditional martial arts in that the training progresses through the following stages:
Predefined sets of movements (kata) and physical conditioning
Variations to the fixed drills (henka), responding to changes in the attacker's movements or situation
Free form training (randori) consisting mostly of spur-of-the-moment, dynamic techniques during which the defender hits, locks, chokes or throws the attacker in a controlled and safe manner
More advanced training consists of controlling the attacker's mind using various techniques such as pain compliance and deception
Training is done in a manner that entails little risk of permanent injury.

The Bujinkan does not adhere to any official guideline or set of rules to limit actions or techniques used during training. The approach used in the Bujinkan includes gaining compliance through pain and utilising potentially damaging techniques in order to survive dangerous situations rather than focusing on winning a competition or evenly matched duel.
As a result, many of the staple responses of a Bujinkan student would be inappropriate in most competitions, but in ring environment the principles of the training can be employed.  One mainstay criticism of Bujinkan training, which is a misconception is that it does not necessarily involve testing techniques (locks, throws, chokes, strikes, etc.) against a fully resisting opponent. This is purely subjective to the instructor and individual practitioner. Bujinkan is widely practiced and utilized by law enforcement, government agencies, military and military contractors, and those in private security. 

The Bujinkan largely focuses on “taijutsu” (body movement / skills) as well as other skills of ninjutsu (ninpo tactics and strategies) and happo biken jutsu (various modern and traditional weapons) - this is The Bujinkan's branch of Kukishin-ryū

Taijutsu
Taijutsu (body combat art) is the Bujinkan system of unarmed defence using strikes, throws, holds, chokes and joint locks. It encompasses skill such as: koppo jutsu is the "way of attacking and/or using the skeletal structure"; “koshi jutsu” is the way of attacking muscles and weak points on the body; jutai jutsu is the "relaxed body method" teaching throwing, grappling and choking techniques and dakentai jutsu which emphasises strikes, kicks and blocks

The first levels of training, such as leaping, tumbling, break fall techniques and body conditioning, form the basis for taijutsu. They are needed to progress into other techniques such as unarmed combat and the use of tools and weapons. Once learned, Taijutsu techniques can be applied to any situation, armed or unarmed.

Tori and Uke
Training begins with two partners practicing pre-arranged forms (waza or kata) and then advancing to unlimited variations of those forms (henka). The basic pattern is for the Tori (Tori, or the person applying the technique) to initiate a technique against the person who receives the technique (Uke).

Ukemi and balance
Bujinkan taijutsu seeks to use body movement and positioning rather than strength to defeat the opponent. All techniques in Bujinkan taijutsu involve unbalancing the opponent while maintaining one's own balance. This is achieved by moving the opponent into inferior positions and manipulating their body along weak lines where it is difficult for the opponent to resist. The attacker continuously seeks to regain balance and cover vulnerabilities (such as an exposed side), while the defender uses position and timing to keep the attacker off balance and vulnerable. In more advanced training, the attacker will sometimes apply  to regain balance and disable the defender.

 refers to the act of receiving a technique. Good ukemi involves a roll or breakfall to avoid pain or injury such as dislocation of a joint. Thus, learning to roll and breakfall effectively is key to safe training in taijutsu. Before receiving the 9th kyu (the lowest rank), a student must demonstrate the ability to roll smoothly in a variety of directions without exposing the neck to injury.

Physical conditioning
Junan taiso (junan meaning flexible) is a yogic method of stretching and breathing by means of which the Bujinkan practitioner may develop and maintain good physical condition and wellbeing. The exercises promote relaxation, blood circulation, muscle toning and flexibility,<ref>[Davey, H.E. (2006). Japanese Yoga: The Way of Dynamic Meditation] Berkeley, USA. . pp. 216.</ref> and form a core part of all training sessions. Junan taiso is a form of conditioning and preparation for the body. All major joints are rotated and stretched in a proper manner while healthy breathing and concentration are practiced.

Origins
Almost all of the martial arts/ryuha in the Bujinkan are listed with their historical lineages in the Bugei Ryuha Daijiten (Encyclopedia of Martial Art Schools, researched by Watatani Kiyoshi and Yamada Tadashi and first published in 1963). From 1968 on (4 years before Takamatsu's death), the Bugei Ryuha Daijiten has had entries for Hatsumi below Takamatsu.

Several Bujinkan ryūha were mentioned in the Kakutogi no Rekishi (History of Fighting Arts). Although details are omitted, it states, "there are several schools that are well-known for being 'effective arts' (jitsuryoku ha)". Among the schools listed in this section are Gyokko Ryū, Gikan-ryū Koppō jutsu, Gyokushin-ryū Ninpō, Kukishin-ryū, Takagi Yōshin-ryū Jūtai jutsu and Asayama Ichiden-ryū (which is not part of the Bujinkan's nine schools but was studied by Hatsumi via Takashi Ueno).

Several of the samurai systems taught by Hatsumi such as Kuki Shinden Ryū Happō Bikenjutsu and Takagi Yoshin Ryū Jūtai jutsu have well documented lineages with different branches of these arts surviving under their own Sōke. However, whilst the ninja's activities are well documented, the nature of ninjutsu & the historical context means that there are no surviving written records of ninjutsu teachings prior to 1676. As a result, some researchers assert that there is no way to independently verify the oral lineage included in the Togakure Ryu tradition.

In the Bugei Ryuha Daijiten the researchers list the full lineage for Togakure-ryū stating the following: "The succession is an oral tradition from Toda Shinryūken. Toda Shinryūken Masamitsu died in 1908 at the age of 90 years. According to the lineage, Ikai originated the school, and in the Yōwa period (1181-1182), it separated from Hakuun Dōshi of Hakuun-ryū and became the Kōga and Iga schools of ninjutsu. The lineage passed through Momochi Sandayū and entered into the Natori-ryū of Kishū domain. From the time of Toda Nobutsuna, the tradition was passed on to the Toda family. This genealogy refers to dates and kuden (orally transmitted stories/lessons) about people implying that these people were older than written records would suggest"

The entry regarding Gyokko Ryu is as follows: "Receiving the tradition of Gyokko ryu Shitojutsu from Sakagami Taro Kunishige of the Tenbun era, Toda Sakyo Ishinsai established Gyokko ryu Koshijutsu as well as Koto ryu Koppojutsu, passing them on to Momochi Sandayu, bringing them within the traditions of Iga ryu Ninjutsu of Toda Shinryuken who lived during the end of the Tokugawa Shogunate (ended 1868). It is said that Toda Shinryuken died in the 14th year of the Meiji Emperor (1881) at the age of 90 years."

The entry regarding Koto Ryu is as follows: "The genesis of koppoujutsu is said to have been in ancient China. Koto ryu was brought to our country by a Chan Bushou* of Korea, after this it was brought within the traditions of Iga ryu Ninjutsu, and it’s revitalization in the Tenbun era is said to have been from Momochi Sandayu inheriting the tradition from Toda Sakyo Ishinsai (oral tradition from Toda Shinryuken)."“Bugei Ryuha Daijiten” page 296

Recent history
Since 1988, Hatsumi's teaching has focused on a particular theme, or focus, each year. This typically means that a specific ryū, or a certain set of techniques from specific ryū, will be taught. Hatsumi announces the year's theme each year at the Daikomyosai.

Depending on what years a student has studied in Japan, they may find that their focus reflects the themes or schools taught during their time. This is one reason why there are often noticeable differences in the techniques of different teachers in the Bujinkan. Although Ninpo Taijutsu is an overall theme of the Bujinkan, 2008 marked the first time that a Ninpo Taijutsu Ryū was the focus of the year. Prior to founding the Bujinkan organization and teaching the nine Ryū collectively (with particular yearly focus), Hatsumi awarded his students rank certificates in individual Ryū. The themes so far have been:

* 2019 - Muto Dori Continued
 2018 - Muto Dori Continued
 2017 - Muto Dori
 2015 - Nagamaki
 2014 – 神韻武導 Shin In Bu Dou / 神 SHIN, JIN god, deity; mind, soul / 韻 IN rhyme; elegance; tone / 武 BU, MU martial, military arts, chivalry. Bu or Mu refers to the warrior, Bushi or Musha / 導 DŌ leading, guiding.
 2013 – Ken Engetsu no Kagami ("mirror of the fullmoon sword")/ Tachi Hôken ("divine treasure sword")— Ken, Tachi, and Katana/ Naginata and Yari
 2012 – Jin Ryo Yo Go - Kaname, Sword and Rokushakubo, separately and with one in each hand
 2011 – Kihon Happo
 2010 – Rokkon Shoujou
 2009 – 才能 魂 器 ”saino konki”/ Talent, Heart, Capacity / Talent, Soul, Capacity
 2008 – Togakure-ryū Ninpō Taijutsu
 2007 – Kukishin Ryu
 2006 – Shinden Fudo Ryu
 2005 – Gyokko-ryū Kosshi jutsu (Bo and Tachi)
 2004 – Daishou Juutai jutsu (Roppo-Kuji-no Biken)
 2003 – Juppo Sessho
 2002 – Jutai jutsu (Takagi Yoshin Ryu)
 2001 – Kosshi jutsu (Gyokko Ryu)
 2000 – Koppo jutsu (Koto Ryu)
 1999 – Kukishinden Ryu
 1998 – Shinden Fudo Ryu
 1997 – Jojutsu
 1996 – Bokken
 1995 – Naginata
 1994 – Yari
 1993 – Rokushakubojutsu
 1992 – Taijutsu Power
 1991 – Sword and Jutte
 1990 – Hanbo
 1989 – Taijutsu and Weapons
 1988 – Taijutsu

No focus was announced for 2009, though Hatsumi talked about three things that are important for a martial artist, which may be loosely considered to be the yearly theme. He said that these things would become a bit of a theme for next year.Sainou (Ability/talent)Kokoro (Heart)Utsuwa (Capacity)

Soon after this theme as was announced, Hatsumi proposed that the second aspect, Kokoro (Heart), be replaced by Tamashii (Soul), reasoning that the heart is constantly changing, whereas the soul is permanent and unchanging and therefore "essential to the person".

Ninpo

Gyokushin-ryū NinpōGyokushin-ryū Ninpō ("The Jeweled Heart School") is taught by the Bujinkan martial arts organization. According to the Bujinkan, Gyokushin Ryu has sutemi waza techniques and is focused more on the art and techniques of espionage than on fighting. Its most prominent weapon is the lasso (nagenawa). The Bugei Ryuha Daijiten states that Takamatsu Toshitsugu transferred the Gyokushin-ryū Ninpō to Hatsumi in the middle of the 20th century, making Hatsumi its lineage holder. Gyokushin-ryū Ninpō is taught today in the Bujinkan organization.Alex Esteve: Exploring the essence of the Martial Arts, Footprints of the Bujinkan dojo soke; primary source, Bujinkan organization According to the Bujinkan martial arts organization, Gyokushin-ryū was founded in the mid-16th century by Sasaki Goeman Teruyoshi, who was also sōke of Gyokko-ryū, which explains the similarities between the two styles. Gyokushin-ryū is considered a style of koshi jutsu. Hatsumi is the 21st sōke.

Togakure-ryū

Togakure ryu Ninjutsu Hidensho is a manuscript in Hatsumi's possession that is said to document Togakure-ryū. It is the purported origin of the "18 skills of Ninjutsu."Ninja jūhakkei was often studied along with Bugei jūhappan (the 18 samurai fighting art skills). Though some techniques were used in the same way by both samurai and ninja, others were used differently by the two groups. The 18 disciplines are:Seishinteki kyōyō (spiritual refinement)Taijutsu (unarmed combat)Kenjutsu (sword techniques including Tojutsu)Bōjutsu (stick and staff techniques)Sōjutsu (spear techniques)Naginatajutsu (naginata techniques)Kusarigamajutsu (kusarigama techniques)Shurikenjutsu (throwing weapons techniques)Kayakujutsu (pyrotechnics)Hensōjutsu (disguise and impersonation)Shinobi-iri (stealth and entering methods)Bajutsu (horsemanship)Sui-ren (water training)Bōryaku (tactics)Chōhō (espionage)Intonjutsu (escaping and concealment)Tenmon (meteorology)Chi-mon (geography)

Historically in Japan, the word is often used interchangeably with jujutsu and many others to refer to a range of grappling skills. It is also used in the martial art of aikido to distinguish unarmed fighting techniques from others, such as those of stick fighting. In ninjutsu, especially since the emergence of the Ninja movie genre, it was used to avoid referring explicitly to "ninja" combat techniques.

Uniforms and rankings

Kyu levels
The Bujinkan Dōjō has a series of kyū (grades) below the level of shodan. The new student starts at mukyu ("without grade") and progresses from kukyu (9-kyu), the lowest rank, to ikkyu (1-kyu), the highest. Unranked (mukyū) practitioners wear white belts, kyu grade practitioners wear green belts (men) or red belts (women), and those with ranks of shōdan and above wear black belts.  In some dojos kyu-level practitioners – especially in children's classes – wear colored belts, though the actual color of the belt varies from place to place. In Japan it was once customary for kyu-level men to wear green belts over a black ninjutsugi and women to wear red belts over a purple ninjutsugi, but this practice has largely been abandoned. Currently, both male and female Bujinkan practitioners now wear green belts over a black ninjutsugi and on the feet they wear tabi (soft-sole tabi for indoor training and jika-tabi for outdoor training) at most dojos.

Dan levels
There are fifteen dan grades in the Bujinkan, although only ten are formally recognised (10th dan has five levels within it). With the exception of fifth dan (see below) there are no fixed criteria for attaining each grade. Different dojos have their own approaches based on the cultural environment and the instructor's preference.

Typically the study of tenchijin ryaku no maki (scrolls of heaven, earth and man) guides progression from 9-kyu to shodan (1st dan) and comprises all the fundamental techniques required for advanced study thereafter. Until 4th dan the student is expected to focus on developing strong foundations and to perfect their form. At 5th dan the training focus changes to becoming more responsive and responding naturally in dynamic & increasingly challenging situations.

In order to attain fifth dan (godan), fourth dan practitioners must submit to a sakki (or godan) test before the sōke to establish that they are able to sense the presence of danger and evade it, which is considered a fundamental survival skill.  After passing this test, a practitioner is considered to be under the protection of the Bujin, or Guiding Spirits, and is entitled to apply for a teaching license (shidōshi menkyo). A shidōshi (士道師) is entitled to open their own Bujinkan dōjō and grade students up to fourth dan. A practitioner between first dan and fourth dan may become a licensed assistant teacher (shidōshi-ho) if backed by and acting under the supervision of a shidōshi. In the Bujinkan, a person ranked tenth dan or higher is often referred to as a shihan.

The practitioner's level is displayed by the color of the art's emblem, called wappen (ワッペン) inscribed with the  kanji "bu"(武) and "jin" (神). There are four kinds of wappen (9 to 1 kyū, 1 to 4 dan, 5 to 9 dan, and 10 to 15 dan), sometimes augmented with up to four silver, gold or white stars (called hoshi) above or around the emblem, representing the individual ranks.

In addition to the kyu/dan system, a few practitioners have earned menkyo kaiden "licenses of complete transmission" in individual schools. These establish that the master practitioner has learned all that there is to learn about the particular lineage. Whereas the kyu/dan ranks are often made public, those who have earned menkyo kaiden rarely divulge their status, sometimes even being reluctant to recognize their actual dan ranking to outsiders.

Criticism of historical claims
Modern Togakure-ryu and various historical claims are taught by Masaaki Hatsumi (Takamatsu's successor) and the Bujinkan organization.  Criticism regarding the historical accuracy of the Bujinkan's claims of lineage have arisen from several issues of the Bugei Ryūha Daijiten:

 The 1978 version of the Bugei Ryūha Daijiten states that Takamatsu's Togakure-ryu "genealogy includes embellishments by referring to data and kuden about persons whose existence is based on written materials and traditions in order to appear older than it actually is."
 The 1969 version of the Bugei Ryūha Daijiten states that Takamatsu's Togakure-ryu "is a genealogy newly put together by Takamatsu Toshitsugu, who made use of (took advantage of) the popularity of written materials on ninjutsu after the Taishō era" and that "there are many points where it has added embellishments, it has made people whose real existence is based on written records older than is actually the case, and so it is a product of very considerable labor".
 The 1963 version of the Bugei Ryūha Daijiten'' states of Takamatsu's Togakure-ryu "this genealogy refers to various written records and oral transmissions and there are many points/places where embellishments have been added and people appearing in the genealogy are also made older than they actually are".

References

Samurai
Ninjutsu organizations